The 2004 Dubai World Cup was a horse race held at Nad Al Sheba Racecourse on Saturday 27 March 2004. It was the 9th running of the Dubai World Cup.

The winner was Diamond A Racing Corporation's Pleasantly Perfect, a six-year-old brown horse trained in the United States by Richard Mandella and ridden by Alex Solis. Pleasantly Perfect's victory was the first in the race for his owner, trainer and jockey.

Pleasantly Perfect had been one of the leading dirt performers in the United States in 2003 when his wins included the Breeders' Cup Classic. Before being shipped to Dubai he won the San Antonio Handicap on 31 January. In the 2004 Dubai World Cup he started the 5/2 second favourite and won by three quarters of a length from the 2/1 favourite Medaglia d'Oro with the South African challenger Victory Moon five length back in third place.

Race details
 Sponsor: none
 Purse: £3,351,955; First prize: £2,011,173
 Surface: Dirt
 Going: Fast
 Distance: 10 furlongs
 Number of runners: 12
 Winner's time: 2:00.24

Full result

 Abbreviations: DSQ = disqualified; nse = nose; nk = neck; shd = head; hd = head; nk = neck
 Qaayed Alkhail also competed as King's Boy

Winner's details
Further details of the winner, Pleasantly Perfect
 Sex: Stallion
 Foaled: 4 February 1998
 Country: United States
 Sire: Pleasant Colony; Dam: Regal State (Affirmed)
 Owner: Diamond A Racing Corporation
 Breeder: Clovelly Farm

References

Dubai World Cup
Dubai World Cup
Dubai World Cup
Dubai World Cup